The 2011 Wychavon District Council election took place on 5 May 2011 to elect members of Wychavon District Council in Worcestershire, England. The whole council was up for election and the Conservative Party stayed in overall control of the council.

Background
After the last election in 2007 the Conservatives controlled the council with 35 councillors, compared to 10 for the Liberal Democrats. However, in October 2009 the Liberal Democrats gained a seat from the Conservatives at a by-election in Droitwich South West.

In 2011 12 candidates, 11 Conservatives and one Liberal Democrat, were elected without opposition, while in Elmley Castle and Somerville the election was delayed after no candidates were nominated for that ward.

Election result
The Conservatives increased their majority on the council, making a net gain of five seats to have 38 councillors after the May election. The Conservative gains came at the expense of the Liberal Democrats, who dropped to 5 seats on the council after losing six seats to the Conservatives. These losses including losing all three seats the Liberal Democrats had held in Droitwich, as well as two seats in Pershore and one seat in The Littletons.

Meanwhile, Labour regained a seat on the council after having lost all of their seats in 2007. The Labour gain came in Droitwich West, where Peter Pinfield was returned to the council defeating Conservative councillor Laurie Evans. Overall turnout at the election was 46.95%.

The above totals include the delayed election in Elmley Castle and Somerville on 23 June 2011.

Ward results

Elmley Castle and Somerville delayed election
The election in Elmley Castle and Somerville was delayed until 23 June 2011 after no candidates were nominated originally. This came after the previous Conservative councillor Anna Mackison died in March 2011. The seat was held for the Conservatives by Roma Kirke with a 238-vote majority over Liberal Democrat Jayne Lewis.

By-elections between 2011 and 2015
A by-election was held in Fladbury on 22 May 2014 after the death of Conservative councillor Tom McDonald. The seat was held for the Conservatives by Bradley Thomas with a majority of 137 votes over Liberal Democrat candidate Diana Brown.

References

2011
2011 English local elections